Creation may refer to:

Religion
Creatio ex nihilo, the concept that matter was created by God out of nothing
Creation myth, a religious story of the origin of the world and how people first came to inhabit it
Creationism, the belief that the universe was created in specific divine acts and the social movement affiliated with it
Creator deity, a deity responsible for the creation of everything that exists
Genesis creation narrative, the biblical account of creation
Creation Museum, a creationist museum in Kentucky
Creation Ministries International, a Christian apologetics organization
Creation Festival, two annual four-day Christian music festivals held in the United States

Entertainment

Music

Albums
Creation (EP), 2016 EP by Seven Lions
Creation (John Coltrane album), 1965
Creation (Branford Marsalis album), 2001
Creation (Keith Jarrett album), 2015
Creation (Archie Roach album), 2013
Creation (The Pierces album), 2014
Creation, album by Creation
Creation, album by Leslie Satcher 2005

Songs
"Creation" (William Billings), a hymn tune composed by William Billings
The Creation, 1954, an orchestral song by Wolfgang Fortner
"Creation", a song by The Creation, 1994
"Creation", a song by Joe Higgs, 1976
"Creation", a song by Jonathan King, 1965
"Creation", a song by The Pierces from Creation, 2014
"Creation", a song by Zion I from Mind Over Matter

Other uses in music
Creation (American band), a teen musical group
Creation (Japanese band), also known as Blues Creation, led by Kazuo Takeda
The Creation (band), a British band
The Creation (Haydn), a 1798 oratorio by Joseph Haydn
Creation, Nathaniel Shilkret's contribution to the Genesis Suite (1945)
Creation Records, a record label created in 1983 by Alan McGee

Other uses in entertainment
Creation (2009 film), by Jon Amiel about the life of Charles Darwin
Creation (unfinished film), a 1931 film that inspired King Kong
Creation (novel), a 1981 novel by Gore Vidal
Creation (Dragonlance), creation of Krynn, a fictional world of Dragonlance
Création, a 1940 ballet by Shirō Fukai
"The Creation of Adam" (ca. 1511), a 1512 section of Michelangelo's fresco Sistine Chapel ceiling
The Creation: An Appeal to Save Life on Earth (2006), a book by biologist Edward O. Wilson
"The Creation" (1927), a poem by James Weldon Johnson, published in God's Trombones: Seven Negro Sermons in Verse
La création du monde, a 1923 ballet by Darius Milhaud
Creation (video game), an unreleased video game developed by Bullfrog Productions

Other uses
Creation (initial grant) of a noble title (such as a dukedom or earldom)

See also
Create (disambiguation)
Creator (disambiguation)
Creation of the world (disambiguation)
The Creation (disambiguation)
Generate (disambiguation)
Origin (disambiguation)
Existence (disambiguation)